The Americas Zone was one of the three zones of the regional Davis Cup competition in 1995.

In the Americas Zone there were three different tiers, called groups, in which teams competed against each other to advance to the upper tier. Winners in Group III advanced to the Americas Zone Group II in 1996. All other teams remained in Group III.

Participating nations

Draw
 Venue: Santo Domingo Tennis Club, Santo Domingo, Dominican Republic
 Date: 1–5 March

Group A

Group B

  and  promoted to Group II in 1996.

Group A

Dominican Republic vs. Puerto Rico

Bermuda vs. Eastern Caribbean

Dominican Republic vs. Costa Rica

Eastern Caribbean vs. Puerto Rico

Bermuda vs. Puerto Rico

Costa Rica vs. Eastern Caribbean

Dominican Republic vs. Eastern Caribbean

Bermuda vs. Costa Rica

Dominican Republic vs. Bermuda

Costa Rica vs. Puerto Rico

Group B

Barbados vs. El Salvador

Jamaica vs. Trinidad and Tobago

Barbados vs. Jamaica

El Salvador vs. Trinidad and Tobago

Barbados vs. Trinidad and Tobago

El Salvador vs. Jamaica

References

External links
Davis Cup official website

Davis Cup Americas Zone
Americas Zone Group III